Aidan Quinn (born March 8, 1959) is an American actor who made his film debut in Reckless (1984). He has starred in over 80 feature films, including Desperately Seeking Susan (1985), The Mission (1986), Stakeout (1987), Avalon (1990), Benny & Joon (1993), Legends of the Fall (1994), Mary Shelley's Frankenstein (1994), Michael Collins (1996), Practical Magic (1998), Song for a Raggy Boy (2003), "Wild Child (film)" (2008) and Unknown (2011).

Quinn has received two Primetime Emmy Award nominations for his work in An Early Frost (1985) and Bury My Heart at Wounded Knee (2007). He played Captain Thomas "Tommy" Gregson in the CBS television series Elementary (2012–2019).

Early life
Quinn was born in Chicago, Illinois, to Irish Catholic parents. He was raised in Chicago and Rockford, Illinois, as well as in Dublin and Birr, County Offaly, Ireland. His mother, Teresa, was a homemaker, but also worked as a bookkeeper and in the travel business, and his father, Michael Quinn, was a professor of English literature at Rock Valley College. When he was nineteen and working as a roofer, Quinn realized he wanted to become an actor. He trained at the Piven Theatre Workshop.

He has three brothers and a sister. His older brother, Declan Quinn, is a cinematographer, and his younger sister, Marian, is an actress, director and writer. His brother Paul, an actor and director, died in 2015 at the age of 55.

Career
His first significant film role was in Reckless, followed by a breakthrough role in Desperately Seeking Susan as the character "Dez" (the love interest of the character played by Rosanna Arquette). Quinn next starred in the controversial television film An Early Frost, about a young gay lawyer dying of AIDS (it was broadcast on NBC on November 11, 1985, and co-starred Gena Rowlands, Ben Gazzara and Sylvia Sidney). He received his first Emmy Award nomination for the role. He made a short impressive contribution as Robert De Niro's brother in The Mission. He played escaped convict Richard "Stick" Montgomery in the action comedy Stakeout opposite Richard Dreyfuss and Emilio Estevez.

In 1983, Quinn lost the role of Jesus Christ when Paramount Pictures dropped the distribution rights to the Martin Scorsese movie The Last Temptation of Christ. When Universal Pictures picked up the film, the role went to Willem Dafoe. In the meantime, Quinn starred as the protagonist in the film Crusoe, finished in 1989.

During the 1990s, he appeared in Legends of the Fall, Benny & Joon, The Handmaid's Tale, Haunted and Practical Magic. He also starred in Michael Collins, Song for a Raggy Boy, This Is My Father, and Evelyn. He had a cameo appearance as the captain of a doomed Arctic vessel in the Francis Ford Coppola-produced adaptation of Frankenstein.

In 2000, Quinn portrayed Paul McCartney in the VH1 television drama Two of Us.

Quinn played Kerry Max Cook in the 2005 movie The Exonerated, a true story about people on death row who had been freed.

Quinn played the main character on the NBC drama The Book of Daniel in 2006. After the first three weeks of its run, the show was canceled, and its last five episodes never aired. In 2007, Quinn received his second Emmy nomination for the television movie Bury My Heart at Wounded Knee.

In 2010, he played a cameo role as William Rainsferd in the French-made film Sarah's Key, set during World War II.

He starred as Dermot opposite Taylor Schilling (Abby) in the Canadian-Irish drama film Stay (2013).

Quinn co-starred in the CBS Television series Elementary.

Personal life

In 1987, Quinn married his Stakeout co-star Elizabeth Bracco (sister of actress Lorraine Bracco). They have two daughters: Mia (b. 1998) and Ava Eileen (b. 1989), who has autism. Ava appeared as the baby "David" in Avalon, and Mia played a ghost in The Eclipse. Former residents of Englewood, New Jersey, Quinn and his family now live in Palisades, Rockland County, New York, and Marbletown in the Catskills / Woodstock region of Ulster County, New York.

As an avid sports fan, Quinn supports the Chicago Cubs, the Green Bay Packers, Michael Jordan, Rory McIlroy, and Roger Federer.

Philanthropy
Quinn has participated in charity golf events for the East Lake Foundation, a community redevelopment program, and Samuel L. Jackson's "One for the Boys" campaign about testicular cancer awareness. In 2010, Quinn attended a premiere benefit screening of A Shine of Rainbows for the International Children's Media Center (ICMC) and The American Ireland Fund (AIF). In 1991, he read a segment from Franz Kafka's The Metamorphosis as part of MTV's "Books: Feed Your Head" literacy promotion PSAs.

Quinn spoke at the 2003 "Night of Too Many Stars" gala benefiting The Autism Coalition. He was an honorary board member of the National Alliance for Autism Research (NAAR), which merged with Autism Speaks.

Filmography

Film

Television

Theatre

Awards and nominations

References

External links

1959 births
20th-century American male actors
21st-century American male actors
Actors from Rockford, Illinois
American male film actors
American male television actors
American people of Irish descent
Autism activists
Living people
Male actors from Chicago